Cannons Wood Football Club is a non-league football club based in Harlow, England. They are currently members of the Eastern Counties League Division One South and play at Goffs Lane, Cheshunt.

History
Formed as DTFC in 2019 by AFTV contributor, Liam Goodenough, the club initially entered the Essex Alliance League. In January 2022, the club announced they had applied to the Football Association to rebrand the club after gaining promotion into Step 6 of the non-league pyramid. Later that year, the club was admitted into the Eastern Counties League Division One South under the new name of Cannons Wood. The name originates from the nearby Canons Brook estate in Harlow.

Ground
In 2020, the club entered a groundsharing agreement with Harlow Town to play at the Harlow Arena. However, following the suspension of football activities at Harlow Town, in December 2022 Cannons Wood began playing their home games at Goffs Lane, Cheshunt, the former home of Broxbourne Borough.

Honours
Essex Alliance League. Cup Winners 2020/21,
Essex Alliance League. Fenton Cup Winners 2020/21,
Essex Alliance League. Senior Division Champions 2021/22,
Essex Alliance League. Senior Division Cup Winners 2021/22

References

Association football clubs established in 2019
2019 establishments in England
Football clubs in England
Football clubs in Essex
Eastern Counties Football League